The Windward River is a river in Fiordland, New Zealand, flowing into Gold Arm, Charles Sound.  The estuary of the Windward River is protected by the Kahukura (Gold Arm) Marine Reserve.

See also
List of rivers of New Zealand

References

Rivers of Fiordland